In the 2018–19 season, Espérance Sportive de Tunis competed in the Ligue 1 for the 64th season, as well as the Tunisian Cup.  It was their 65th consecutive season in the top flight of Tunisian football. They competed in Ligue 1, the Champions League, Super Cup, the Arab Club Champions Cup, the FIFA Club World Cup, the CAF Super Cup and the Tunisian Cup.

Pre-season

Competitions

Overview

{| class="wikitable" style="text-align: center"
|-
!rowspan=2|Competition
!colspan=8|Record
!rowspan=2|Started round
!rowspan=2|Final position / round
!rowspan=2|First match
!rowspan=2|Last match
|-
!
!
!
!
!
!
!
!
|-
| Ligue 1

| 
| style="background:gold;"| Winners
| 22 August 2018
| 15 June 2019
|-
| Tunisian Cup

| Round of 64
| Semi-finals
| 29 January 2019
| 6 June 2019
|-
| Super Cup

| Final
| style="background:gold;"| Winners
| colspan=2| 1 April 2019
|-
| CAF Super Cup

| Final
| style="background:silver;"| Runners–up
| colspan=2| 29 March 2019
|-
| Champions League

| Group stage
| style="background:gold;"| Winners
| 17 July 2018
| 9 November 2018
|-
| Champions League

| Group stage
| style="background:gold;"| Winners
| 11 January 2019
| 31 May 2019
|-
| Club Champions Cup

| colspan=2| First round
| 9 August 2018
| 2 September 2018
|-
| FIFA Club World Cup

| Second round
| Fifth place
| 15 December 2018
| 18 December 2018
|-
! Total

Ligue 1

League table

Results summary

Results by round

Matches

Tunisian Cup

Tunisian Super Cup

CAF Super Cup

FIFA Club World Cup

2018 Champions League

Group stage

Group A

knockout stage

Quarter-finals

Semi-finals

Final

2019 Champions League

Group stage

Group B

knockout stage

Quarter-finals

Semi-finals

Final

Espérance de Tunis were initially declared winners following a refusal by Wydad Casablanca to resume play following an issue with VAR, though CAF later ruled the second leg must be replayed in a neutral venue to decide the champions. However, the decision to order a replay was thrown out by the Court of Arbitration for Sport (CAS), who told the Confederation of African Football (CAF) to refer the case to its proper disciplinary structures for a decision, and on 7 August 2019, Espérance de Tunis were declared winners for a second time.

Club Championship Cup

First round

Squad information

Playing statistics

|-
! colspan=16 style=background:#dcdcdc; text-align:center| Goalkeepers

|-
! colspan=16 style=background:#dcdcdc; text-align:center| Defenders

|-
! colspan=16 style=background:#dcdcdc; text-align:center| Midfielders

|-
! colspan=16 style=background:#dcdcdc; text-align:center| Forwards

|-
! colspan=16 style=background:#dcdcdc; text-align:center| Players transferred out during the season

Goalscorers
Includes all competitive matches. The list is sorted alphabetically by surname when total goals are equal.

Transfers

In

Out

Notes

References

2018-19
Tunisian football clubs 2018–19 season
Esperance